Rovena is a given name and surname. Notable people with the name include:

 Rovena Stefa (born 1979), Albanian singer
 Rovena Marku, Olympic freestyle swimmer from Albania
 Marcella Rovena, Italian film and voice actress

See also
 Cheneya rovena, a moth in the family Bombycidae